Roly Russell is a Canadian politician, who was elected to the Legislative Assembly of British Columbia in the 2020 British Columbia general election. He represents the electoral district of Boundary-Similkameen as a member of the British Columbia New Democratic Party.

Electoral Record

References

21st-century Canadian politicians
British Columbia New Democratic Party MLAs
People from the Regional District of Kootenay Boundary
Living people
Year of birth missing (living people)